Redbird is an unincorporated community in Raleigh County, West Virginia, United States. It was named after the official bird of West Virginia, the northern cardinal, which is sometimes referred to as a redbird.

References 

Unincorporated communities in West Virginia
Unincorporated communities in Raleigh County, West Virginia